William Alfred Stoltzfus Jr. (November 3, 1924 – September 6, 2015) was an American Foreign Service Officer and diplomat.

Early life
Stoltzfus was born in Beirut in 1924.  His father was a Mennonite from Ohio and his mother a Presbyterian from Minneapolis.  Stoltzfus' father was principal of a boys' school in Aleppo, Syria, and later president of the Beirut College for Women.

Stoltzfus was tutored in Aleppo before going to the American Community School in Beirut and learned to speak Arabic and French at an early age.  At fifteen, he returned to the United States to attend Deerfield Academy and, later, Princeton University.

In 1943 Stoltzfus left Princeton to become a pilot in the United States Naval Air Corps.  He returned to Princeton at the end of the war and attended the Woodrow Wilson School of Public Affairs.  After his graduation in 1949, Stoltzfus failed his first attempt at the Foreign Service exam; his childhood abroad left him without a strong knowledge of U.S. geography.

Diplomatic career
Stoltzfus' first post was in Alexandria, Egypt, where he worked as an economic officer and reported on the production of flax and other natural resources.  After doing economic reporting in Benghazi, Libya, Stoltzfus was assigned to Kuwait, where he did consular work with Palestinian refugees applying for visas to the United States. He then did political reporting in Jidda, Damascus, and Aden before being assigned as Ambassador to Oman, Qatar, and Bahrain in 1972. In 1974, he would return to Kuwait, his first posting, as the new ambassador.  In 1976 Stoltzfus retired from the foreign service and went into banking.

Service chronology

Personal life 
Stoltzfus married educator Janet Sorg in 1954. They had five children together. After he retired from the Foreign Service, they lived in Princeton, New Jersey, and in London. His wife died in 2004, and Stoltzfus died in 2015, at the age of 90.

References

External links
 Interview

1924 births
2015 deaths
Ambassadors of the United States to Bahrain
Ambassadors of the United States to Kuwait
Ambassadors of the United States to Oman
Ambassadors of the United States to Qatar
Ambassadors of the United States to the United Arab Emirates
United States Navy pilots of World War II
United States Foreign Service personnel
American expatriates in Lebanon
American expatriates in Syria
American expatriates in Egypt
American expatriates in Yemen
American expatriates in Saudi Arabia
20th-century American diplomats